Albert Joseph "Smiling Al" Maul (October 9, 1865  May 3, 1958) was an American professional baseball player.  He was a pitcher and outfielder over parts of 15 seasons (1884–1901) in Major League Baseball with the Philadelphia Keystones, Philadelphia Quakers/Phillies, Pittsburgh Alleghenys, Pittsburgh Burghers, Washington Senators, Baltimore Orioles, Brooklyn Superbas, and New York Giants.  He led the National League in earned run average in 1895 while playing for Washington. For his career, he compiled an 84–80 record in 188 appearances, with a 4.45 ERA and 352 strikeouts.  Maul was born in Philadelphia, Pennsylvania and died there at the age of 92. At the time of his death, Maul was the last surviving participant of the Union Association.

See also

 List of Major League Baseball annual ERA leaders

References

External links

 

1865 births
1958 deaths
19th-century baseball players
Major League Baseball pitchers
Philadelphia Keystones players
Philadelphia Quakers players
Philadelphia Phillies players
Pittsburgh Alleghenys players
Pittsburgh Burghers players
Washington Senators (1891–1899) players
Baltimore Orioles (NL) players
Brooklyn Superbas players
New York Giants (NL) players
National League ERA champions
Binghamton Bingoes players
Binghamton Crickets (1880s) players
Rochester Maroons players
Nashville Blues players
Buffalo Bisons (minor league) players
Philadelphia Athletics (minor league) players
Lehigh Mountain Hawks baseball coaches
Baseball players from Philadelphia